The Mahaut River is a river in Dominica. It rises on the western slopes of Morne Trois Pitons, flowing west to reach the Caribbean Sea on the country's western coast, close to the town of Massacre.

Rivers of Dominica